El-Sayed Mohamed (born 3 September 1965) is an Egyptian basketball player. He competed in the men's tournament at the 1988 Summer Olympics.

References

1965 births
Living people
Egyptian men's basketball players
Olympic basketball players of Egypt
Basketball players at the 1988 Summer Olympics
Place of birth missing (living people)